Galatasaray HDI Sigorta is the men volleyball section of Galatasaray SK, a major sports club in Istanbul, Turkey. Galatasaray play their matches in the 7000-seat arena TVF Burhan Felek Sport Hall.

Previous names
 Galatasaray (1922–2011)
 Galatasaray Yurtiçi Kargo (2011–2012)
 Galatasaray (2012–2013)
 Galatasaray FXTCR (2013–2015)
 Galatasaray HDI Sigorta (2015-present)

Honours

Domestic competitions
 Turkish Men's Volleyball League:
Winners (4): 1970-1971, 1986-1987, 1987-1988, 1988-1989
  Chancellor Cup:
Winners (1): 1993

Defunct Domestic competitions
 Turkish Men's Volleyball Championship:
 Winners (12) (record): 1955, 1956, 1957, 1958, 1960, 1961, 1962, 1963, 1964, 1965, 1966, 1967

Defunct Regional Titles
 Istanbul Volleyball League:
 Winners (18) (record): 1931-32, 1934–35, 1940–41, 1943–44, 1944–45, 1949–50, 1953–54, 1954–55, 1955–56, 1956–57, 1958–59, 1959–60, 1960–61, 1961–62, 1962–63, 1963–64, 1964–65, 1965–66

International competitions
 CEV Cup:
 Runners-up: 2019
 CEV Challenge Cup:
 4th: 1992

Technical Staff

Team roster

Previous

Former coaches

Team captains
This is a list of the senior team's captains in the recent years.

See also
 Galatasaray Women's Volleyball Team
 Turkey men's national volleyball team

References

External links
 Official Galatasaray Volleyball Branch Website 
 Galatasaray Istanbul » players __ Volleybox.net 
 Turkish Volleyball Federastion official website 

 

Volleyball clubs established in 1922
1922 establishments in the Ottoman Empire